The thirty-first series of the British medical drama television series Casualty commenced airing on BBC One in the United Kingdom on 27 August 2016, and concluded on 29 July 2017. The series consisted of 44 episodes, including the show's feature-length thirtieth anniversary special episode, "Too Old for This Shift". Erika Hossington continued her role as series producer, while Oliver Kent continued his role as the show's executive producer until the end of the series. Seventeen cast members reprised their roles from the previous series with original character Lisa "Duffy" Duffin returning to the series as part of the show's thirtieth anniversary. Rik Makarem appeared in the series between October 2016 and January 2017 as first year foundation doctor (F1) Sebastian Grayling. This series also featured the death of regular character Caleb Knight (Richard Winsor), who has appeared since series 28.

The opening episode of the series was a special feature-length episode, celebrating thirty years of the medical drama. The episode featured main character crossovers from Holby City, with Jac Naylor (Rosie Marcel), Henrik Hanssen (Guy Henry) and Adrian "Fletch" Fletcher (Alex Walkinshaw) appearing in the episode. Various former characters who have appeared in previous series throughout the thirty years of broadcast also made guest appearances during the episode. The episode features both the main characters lives, and the hospital itself in danger when an air ambulance crashed in the emergency department car park. The episode was watched by 7.20 million viewers. A special soundtrack was recorded for the episode, by the BBC National Orchestra of Wales. The series concluded with a special episode, "One", filmed in a single-take, using one camera, forty microphones and five boom operators. Show co-creator Paul Unwin returned to the show to write the episode.

The series was well received by fans and critics alike. They enjoyed the opening episode and opined that the show deserved an award, but an air ambulance charity thought the episode was thoughtless. On 25 January 2017, Casualty was awarded Best Drama at the National Television Awards. On 11 April 2017, the show was nominated for Best Soap & Continuing Drama at the BAFTAs, but was unsuccessful. The helicopter crash won the award for Best Drama Storyline at the 2017 Inside Soap Awards; Charlie and Duffy's wedding and Cal's murder also received a nomination in the category.

Production
Oliver Kent continued his role as executive producer, whilst Erika Hossington remained as the series producer. Kent was appointed Head of Continuing Drama Series for BBC Scripted Studios in late 2016, with Simon Harper, series producer of Holby City at the time, subsequently being appointed acting executive producer of both shows. Harper was later promoted to the show's official executive producer on 8 June 2017, although Kent was credited in the role of executive producer until the end of the series. Mark Catley, the show's story consultant, was credited as co-executive producer for the first episode only. The thirty-first series consisted of 44 episodes.

The feature-length anniversary episode that began the series, aired for 99-minutes on 27 August 2016, and featured a storyline event that connected Casualty with its sister show Holby City. The BBC National Orchestra of Wales recorded a special soundtrack for the episode at BBC Hoddinott Hall in Cardiff Bay. Plans for the special were teased back in August 2014, when Hossington hinted that the show would do something "no other show had done before". In an interview with What's on TV, Charles Venn revealed that his character, Jacob Masters, would have a key role in the anniversary special. He added that cast and crew members were nicknaming the episode "Casualty: The Movie" while it was being filmed. Kent later stated that the episode would make the audience "gasp, laugh and cry buckets".

Hossington teased the series finale in an interview with Sophie Dainty of Digital Spy, promising to give viewers "a live experience" without making a live episode. She described the episode as "special and unique" and said it would be "something that the show has never, ever done before." Hossington also promised several stunts, including a "really big falling stunt within the hospital" in the latter half of the series. Further details on the series finale were revealed on 5 April 2017, where it was announced that the episode, "One", will be shot in a single-take, using one camera, 40 microphones and five boom operators. The finale was one hour long and was written by the show's co-creator, Paul Unwin. Hossington said the special episode would "give the audience a unique insight into an hour in A&E". She added that the episode would be "intense" and "emotional".

Cast

Overview 
The thirty-first series of Casualty features a cast of characters working in the emergency department of Holby City Hospital. The majority of the cast from the previous series continue to appear in this series. Amanda Mealing appears as clinical lead and consultant in emergency medicine Connie Beauchamp, whilst Jaye Griffiths and William Beck appear as consultants Elle Gardner, who also briefly acted as clinical lead, and Dylan Keogh. George Rainsford, Richard Winsor and Crystal Yu portray speciality registrars Ethan Hardy, Caleb "Cal" Knight and Lily Chao. Chelsea Halfpenny appears as Alicia Munroe, a second year foundation doctor (F2). Charles Venn portrays clinical nurse manager Jacob Masters, whilst Derek Thompson stars as senior charge nurse Charlie Fairhead, who has appeared in the show since its conception. Amanda Henderson, Azuka Oforka and Jason Durr play staff nurses Robyn Miller, Louise Tyler and David Hide. Michael Stevenson and Lloyd Everitt star as paramedics Iain Dean and Jez Andrews. Tony Marshall and Jamie Davis appear as receptionist and porter Noel Garcia and Max Walker respectively. Emily Carey and Owain Arthur appear as Grace Beauchamp-Strachan and Glen Thomas in a recurring capacity.

It was announced on 7 June 2016 that, following three guest appearances in the previous series, Cathy Shipton had returned to the show as a regular cast member. Her character, Lisa "Duffy" Duffin, who appeared in the show across various stints since its inception, returned in the opening episode of the series. Of Shipton's return, Kent said, "All of us at Casualty are incredibly excited that the fabulous Cathy Shipton has agreed to bring Duffy back to the Emergency Department." Arthur made his final appearance in episode 9 when his character Glen Thomas jilts his fiancée, Robyn Miller (Henderson). Tom Chambers guest appeared in episode 3 as Sam Strachan, Grace's father, following two appearances in the previous series. Chambers was a regular cast member in the show's spin-off show, Holby City, between 2006 and 2008. Hossington announced that Sam would be reintroduced to the series after receiving a job as the hospital's medical director. Sam returned in episode 24. Chambers later revealed that he would be leaving at the end of his contract due to a prior commitment. It was announced on 7 February 2017 that the show had filmed a funeral for a regular character, and episode 33 featured the death of Cal Knight (Winsor) after he was stabbed by a white supremacist who blamed Ethan for his father's death. Winsor decided to leave the series of his own accord, but was initially surprised to discover his character would be killed off, before coming round to the idea.

Several former regular cast members reprised their roles and made a cameo appearance within the show's feature-length opening episode, which included: Mackenzie "Big Mac" Chalker (Charles Dale), who departed the show in the previous series; Tess Bateman (Suzanne Packer), who appeared in the show for twelve years; Jay Faldren (Ben Turner), who appeared between 2008 and 2011; John "Abs" Denham (James Redmond), who departed from the show in 2008; Alice Chantrey (Sam Grey), who appeared in the show for over four years; Mike Barratt (Clive Mantle), who appeared in the show between 1993 and 1998; Comfort Jones (Martina Laird), who left the show in 2006; and Lenny Lyons (Steven Miller) who appeared in the show for three years. Ian Bleasdale also reprised the role of Josh Griffiths, one of the show's longest-serving characters, for the entirety of the episode. Bleasdale made a further three appearances in the series as Josh in episodes 20, 21 and 36. Russell Boulter reprised his role as Ryan Johnson for two episodes to resolve a storyline about his estranged marriage to Duffy.

During the feature-length special, three characters from Holby City made guest appearances: hospital chief executive officer (CEO) Henrik Hanssen (Guy Henry), cardiothoracic surgeon and clinical lead of Darwin ward Jac Naylor (Rosie Marcel), and ward manager of the AAU Adrian "Fletch" Fletcher (Alex Walkinshaw). Walkinshaw had previously appeared in Casualty between 2012 and 2014. Mealing, Stevenson, Everitt and Tonicha Lawrence, who plays patient Stephanie Sims, appeared in the episode of Holby City that followed the feature-length special, "Protect and Serve". Kent promised "several" more crossovers between the two shows following this. Marcel also appeared in episode 3, alongside John Michie, who plays consultant neurosurgeon Guy Self on Holby City. Michie previously appeared in Casualty in 2014 when his character was the hospital's CEO. Hugh Quarshie guest appeared as acting CEO Ric Griffin in episodes 17 and 18. Chizzy Akudolu confirmed that she would make a guest appearance in the series, portraying her Holby City character, consultant cardiothoracic surgeon Mo Effanga. The character appeared in episode 30. Lee Mead filmed a guest appearance as staff nurse Lofty Chiltern, a former Casualty character and current Holby City character, which was broadcast in episode 38.

On 31 August 2016, it was confirmed that Rik Makarem had joined the cast as Sebastian Grayling. Makarem made his first on-screen appearance in episode 10, on 29 October 2016. Makarem left the series after appearing in eight episodes, making his departure in episode 17, broadcast on 7 January 2017. Sebastian's father, Archie Grayling, a consultant surgeon, was introduced for the storyline. James Wilby was cast in the role of Archie and also left in episode 17. Iain's sister, Gemma Dean (Rebecca Ryan), joined the series in episode 19, and departed in episode 33.

The series featured several recurring characters, and numerous guest stars. Lawrence continued her role as Stephanie Sims into the feature-length episode. The show's winter 2016 trailer confirmed Lawrence had reprised her role, and Steph made another appearance in episode 23. Accredited actress Pam St. Clement was cast as "surly" patient Sally Hodge who appeared in the feature-length episode. St. Clement's return to the role was announced on 12 December 2016, and Hossington confirmed that she would return for a guest appearance in March; St. Clement appeared in episode 26. Poppy Jhakra was also cast as agency nurse Amira Zafar for the feature-length episode. Jhakra reprised the role for an appearance in episode 22. David's family was introduced in episode 5, with the appearance of his son and former wife, Oliver Hide (Harry Collett) and Rosa Hide (Lorraine Pilkington). Collett reprised the role in episodes 17, 18 and 25. Hossington revealed in February 2017 that the show would reintroduce a family who guest appeared in the previous series. On 16 March 2017, it was announced that Roy Ellisson (John Killoran) and Denise Ellisson (Lucy Benjamin) would be reintroduced in April, alongside their sons Scott Ellisson (Will Austin) and Mickey Ellisson (Mitch Hewer). Harper said that there would be "explosive consequences" following the family's arrival. Killoran appeared in two episodes, before his character was killed off, whereas the rest of the family began making recurring appearances. Episode 43 marked the death of Austin's character.

The cast of series 31 saw many returning and guest characters, to complement the main series cast:

Main characters 

 William Beck as Dylan Keogh
 Jamie Davis as Max Walker
 Jason Durr as David Hide
 Lloyd Everitt as Jez Andrews
 Jaye Griffiths as Elle Gardner
 Chelsea Halfpenny as Alicia Munroe
 Amanda Henderson as Robyn Miller
 Tony Marshall as Noel Garcia
 Amanda Mealing as Connie Beauchamp
 Azuka Oforka as Louise Tyler
 George Rainsford as Ethan Hardy
 Cathy Shipton as Lisa "Duffy" Duffin 
 Michael Stevenson as Iain Dean
 Derek Thompson as Charlie Fairhead
 Charles Venn as Jacob Masters
 Richard Winsor as Caleb Knight 
 Crystal Yu as Lily Chao

Recurring characters 

 Billy Angel as Hugo Bonning 
 Owain Arthur as Glen Thomas 
 Will Austin as Scott Ellisson 
 Lucy Benjamin as Denise Ellisson 
 Emily Carey as Grace Beauchamp-Strachan
 Tom Chambers as Sam Strachan 
 Harry Collett as Oliver Hide 
 Guy Henry as Henrik Hanssen 
 Mitch Hewer as Mickey Ellisson 
 Rik Makarem as Sebastian Grayling 
 Rebecca Ryan as Gemma Dean

Guest characters 

 Chizzy Akudolu as Mo Effanga 
 Ian Bleasdale as Josh Griffiths 
 Russell Boulter as Ryan Johnson 
 Charles Dale as Mackenzie "Big Mac" Chalker 
 James Gaddas as Howard Munroe 
 Sam Grey as Alice Chantrey 
 Ariel Ivo Reid as Tara Jewkes 
 Poppy Jhakra as Amira Zafar 
 John Killoran as Roy Ellisson 
 Martina Laird as Comfort Jones 
 
 Clive Mantle as Mike Barratt 
 Rosie Marcel as Jac Naylor 
 Lee Mead as Ben "Lofty" Chiltern 
 John Michie as Guy Self 
 Steven Miller as Lenny Lyons 
 Amy Noble as PC Kate Wilkinson 
 Hugh Quarshie as Ric Griffin 
 Suzanne Packer as Tess Bateman 
 James Redmond as John "Abs" Denham 
 Pam St. Clement as Sally Hodge 
 Ben Turner as Jay Faldren 
 Alex Walkinshaw as Adrian Fletcher 
 James Wilby as Archie Grayling 
 Tracey Wilkinson as Jackie Munroe

Episodes

Reception

Critical response 
The anniversary episode received strong praise from fans. Radio Times reported that viewers were left "stunned" by the episode, while Digital Spy stated that fans were left in "shock and awe" over the episode. The Daily Mirror reporter Sharon Marshall praised the episode, branding it as a "pitch-perfect episode mixing gore, heartache, drama and nostalgia". Marshall added that the episode "showcased what Casualty does best – beautiful writing and a stellar cast who grab your heartstrings," before concluding her review by praising the episode as being able to make the show "look as fresh and exciting as the day it was born." However, the show also received criticism, with the episode being branded "insensitive" by the Midlands Air Ambulance Charity.

The final episode of the series received a mixed reception. Alison Graham, writing for the Radio Times, described the episode as a "bold piece of television" and praised the show for displaying "the chaos of a front-line service". Jessica Ransom of What's on TV enjoyed the episode and was impressed that there were no mistakes. She said the episode highlighted the "ever chaotic trauma" and a "particularly explosive day" in the emergency department. Michael Hogan of The Daily Telegraph wrote a review on the episode, awarding it a score of 3 out of 5. While he thought that the fly-on-the-wall theme created "intensity and realism" within the episode, he opined that some speeches from the characters "didn't quite work" and found the explanations during the episode "jarring". He praised the decision to have original cast members, Shipton and Thompson, lead the episode, but commented that the episode was "let down by a clunking script that needed some doctoring of its own."

Broadcast ratings 
Ratings for series 31 of Casualty averaged at 5.61 million viewers, an increase on the previous series. The opening episode received an overnight rating of 5.10 million viewers, a 26% share of the total audience. BBC Media Centre later revealed the episode was watched by an audience of 7.20 million viewers. The single-take episode that concluded the series received a 28-day rating of 6.57 million viewers. Episode 1 is the highest-rated episode of the series, while episode 31 is the lowest-rated episode of the series with a rating of 4.73 million viewers.

Awards and nominations 
On 25 January 2017, Casualty was awarded Best Drama at the annual National Television Awards. The show was shortlisted against Cold Feet, Game of Thrones, Happy Valley and The Night Manager. On the win, Shipton commented, "I'm not that surprised we won tonight. I'm a newbie and the strength of the cast and the writing and the passion behind that show is on screen and that's why they voted for us." Hossington called the reaction to the win "electric" and said it had "a huge impact on everybody". She added that the show's team were "so chuffed that the sheer love and hard work that they put into the show has been appreciated by the audience and the fans". The win also received criticism from those who believed that Casualty should be classified as a soap opera and not entered into the category.

It was announced on 11 April 2017 that Casualty had been nominated for a BAFTA award under the Soap & Continuing Drama category. ITV soap opera Emmerdale won the accolade. The helicopter crash, Charlie and Duffy's wedding and Cal's murder were shortlisted for Best Drama Storyline at the 2017 Inside Soap Awards. On 6 November 2017, the helicopter crash won the "Best Drama Storyline" accolade.  Casualty was shortlisted in the "Best Soap/Continuing Drama" category at the 2018 Broadcast Awards, but lost out to Channel 4 soap opera Hollyoaks. Judges praised the "truth and sensitivity" involved in Robyn's premature birth storyline and found the use of puppets as Robyn's baby "amazing".

Notes

References

External links
 Casualty Series 31 at BBC Online
 Casualty Series 31 at the Internet Movie Database

31
2016 British television seasons
2017 British television seasons